Upītis (feminine: Upīte) is a Latvian masculine surname, derived from the Latvian word for "river" (upe). Individuals with the surname include:

Ernests Birznieks-Upītis (1871–1960), Latvian writer, translator and librarian
Juris Upītis (born 1991), Latvian ice hockey player
Pēteris Upītis (1896–1976), Latvian horticulturist
Pēteris Upītis  (1899–1989), Latvian graphic artist and art collector 

Latvian-language masculine surnames